Kisumu International Airport is an international airport in Kisumu, the third-largest city in Kenya . It is the third-busiest airport in Kenya, the busiest airport in Kenya west of Nairobi, and the country's fourth international airport. 

KIA is set for a second phase of a 4.9 billion shilling expansion that will include the construction of a parallel taxiway, cargo apron and associated facilities.

Airlines and destinations

References

External links 

 Kenya Airports Authority – Kisumu Airport

Airports in Kenya
Kisumu